Nidamanur is a village in Tangutur Mandal, Prakasam district of Andhra Pradesh.

References

Villages in Prakasam district